Wellsoceras is a tetragonoceratid that starts off with an evolute shell in which whorls are in contact, but has a mature living chamber that diverges and becomes free.  The whorl section is slightly wider than high and is faintly subquadrangular.  Flanks are slightly convex and tend to converge very slightly toward the center.  All shoulders are strongly rounded. The suture is straight ventrally or with a slight ventral lobe, well developed lateral lobes, and a broad, low dorsal saddle.  The siphuncle is located half way between the center and the ventral margin.

Wellsoceras has been found in Middle Devonian sediments in eastern North America, in Ohio, Indiana, and Ontario.

References
 Bernhard Kummel, 1964.  Nautiloidea-Nautilida; Treatise on Invertebrate Paleontology, Part L;  Geological Society of America; R.C. Moore & Curt Teichert, (eds).

Nautiloids
Taxa named by Rousseau H. Flower